Souaken is a small town and rural commune in Larache Province of the Tanger-Tetouan-Al Hoceima region of Morocco. At the time of the 2004 census, the commune had a total population of 12,362 people living in 1841 households.

References

Populated places in Larache Province
Rural communes of Tanger-Tetouan-Al Hoceima